The Cartagena Naval Base, also known as Arsenal of Cartagena, is a military base and arsenal of the Spanish Navy located in the city of Cartagena. It is one of the oldest naval bases in Spain, having been created in the 18th century. Located in the southeast of the Iberian Peninsula, it is the main Spanish base in the Mediterranean Sea.

History

The port of Cartagena, first founded by the Carthaginians in the 2nd century BC, occupies a strategic location on the Mediterranean Sea. It remained a commercial port until the reign of Philip V, when it was redeveloped as a major naval base alongside the expansion of the Spanish Navy.

Construction of the arsenal began in late 1731, and was completed in 1782, during the reign of Charles III. The final cost came to 112 million reales. The Cartagena naval base was a major industrial complex by the 18th century, with shipyards and workshops, carrying out carpentry, rigging and blacksmithing, as well as crafts and fine arts workshops to produce ship ornamentation and decoration. In the second half of the 18th century, 21 ships, 17 frigates and more than fifty brigs, xebecs, hulks, galleys, etc. were built there, as well as a large number of smaller vessels. The Arsenal employed several thousand people in the construction and the maintenance of the units of the Spanish Navy.

The Naval Base was enlarged during the reign of Isabel II in 1849. In 1889, electricity was introduced into the arsenal. In 1918, the moats of the dry docks built by Feringán were developed as submarine docks, in which role they still serve.

Ships
 Galerna-class submarines
 Galerna
 Mistral
 Tramontana

 Segura-class minehunters
 Segura
 Sella
 Tambre
 Turia
 Duero
 Tajo

 Transport ships
Martín Posadillo (owned by the Spanish Army but operated by the Navy)
 El Camino Español (owned by the Spanish Army but operated by the Navy)
 Polar research ships
 BIO Hespérides
 Las Palmas
 EW support ship 
 Alerta
 Chilreu-class patrol vessels
 Alborán
 Tarifa
 Descubierta-class corvettes

 Infanta Elena
 Infanta Cristina
 Toralla-class patrol vessels
 Toralla
 Formentor
 Submarine rescue ships
 Neptuno
 Meteoro-class offshore patrol vessel
 Audaz
 Furor

See also
 Rota Naval Base
 Escuela Naval Militar

References

Military installations of Spain
Spanish Navy bases
Cartagena, Spain